Massachusetts Maritime Academy (Mass Maritime) is a public university in Buzzards Bay, Massachusetts, focused on maritime-related fields. It was established in 1891 and is the second oldest state maritime academy in the United States. Originally established to graduate deck and engineering officers for the U.S. Merchant Marine, the academy has since expanded its curriculum. Though not required, some graduates go on to serve in active and reserve components of the U.S. Armed Forces. The academy operates a training ship, the USTS Kennedy.

Regiment of Cadets

All residential students are members of the Academy's Regiment of Cadets.  Within the Regiment, cadets supervise other cadets in a broad variety of activities, including the orientation of freshmen, room inspections, Morning Formation, daily cleaning stations, study hours, sea term planning and shipboard responsibilities. Students who seek to enroll in the Facilities Engineering or the Emergency Management programs as non-uniformed commuter students must apply in writing for admission to that status.

Academy freshmen, called "Youngies" (short for "young ladies and gentlemen"), arrive at the Academy in mid-August for Orientation, a two-week military-style indoctrination program that is physically and mentally demanding.  It encompasses regimental training, military drill, and physical fitness.  It also serves as an introduction to shipboard/maritime safety, nomenclature, and customs. The indoctrination period and cadet candidate program is essential to the preparation for the youngies' first semester at sea (sea term) in January.

After Orientation, the academic year begins. For the rest of their first academic year as fourth class cadets, Youngies continue to be required to adhere to stringent rules affecting many aspects of their daily life.

Second class cadets (juniors) are designated Squad Leaders and are in charge of the training of the Youngies.  First class cadets (seniors) hold cadet officer positions within the regiment and/or aboard the training ship.

Special units

Regimental Band and Chorus
Composed of an average of 40 members, the MMA Band and Chorus is the musical ensemble of the Academy and the official music department at MMA. It takes part in ceremonial events at MMA as well as changes of command, military retirements, and funerals at Massachusetts National Cemetery along with other major events nationwide. The band also provides music for community events around the New England, region.

The band consists of the following ensembles:

Ceremonial Field and Concert Band
Chamber Chorus
Jazz Ensemble "First Watch"
Buccaneers Brass Band

To learn more: https://www.maritime.edu/clubs-orgs/band-honor

Alpha Platoon
The MMA Drill Team, Alpha Platoon is the regiment's exhibition drill unit whose members are selected after a semester of mastering drill and ceremony.

Honour Guard
The honour guard is primarily a ceremonial color guard consisting of at least 6 cadets. They are responsible for the posting of the colours during athletic events. It also maintains a sabre team for other events at the MMA.

Academics

Prior to the expansion of its offered majors in 1990, the academy was exclusively a merchant marine college, tasked with the training of future cargo ship officers.  The academy only offered majors in the ship transport subjects of Marine Transportation and Marine Engineering. The academy now offers many more majors focused on maritime subjects including graduate degrees. The seven majors offered at the Massachusetts Maritime Academy are Marine Transportation (DECK), Marine Engineering (MENG), International Maritime Business (IMBU), Energy Systems Engineering (ESE), Facilities Engineering (FENG), Emergency Management (EM), and Marine Science Safety and Environmental Protection (MSSEP). Massachusetts Maritime Academy is accredited by the New England Commission of Higher Education.

Sea term

Sea terms are conducted between the two academic semesters, in January and February.  Cadets register soon after the New Year holiday and prepare the USTS Kennedy for sailing, including loading provisions in the freezers and dry stores spaces. The ship sails for foreign ports of the Caribbean Sea three out of four years, and one in four formerly traveled to the Mediterranean Sea. At least one of the Caribbean voyages includes the Panama Canal and an Equator crossing.

The voyage lasts about 52 days on average, and during that time a cadet will rotate through class and laboratory training at sea, ships operations including deck and engine watches, maintenance and emergency drills. Port visits offer a time to relax, but still include watch responsibilities and ship's maintenance.

Training ships
 USS Enterprise (17 October 1892 – 4 May 1909)
 USS Ranger (26 April 1909 – 29 October 1917) rechristened to Rockport
 Rockport (30 October 1917 – 20 February 1918) rechristened to USS Nantucket during World War I
 USS Nantucket (21 February 1918 – 1920s) rechristened to Bay State
 Bay State (1920s–1941) rechristened to TV Emery Rice upon her transfer to the US Merchant Marine Academy
 Keystone State (1942) former USCGC Seneca, borrowed from Pennsylvania Maritime Academy
 American Pilot (1943–1945) former Empire State
 American Mariner (1946) former George Calvert
 Yankee States (1947) former USS Sirona, shared with Maine Maritime Academy
 SC 1321 (1946–1948)
 USS Charleston (1949–1957)
 USTS Bay State II (1957–1973) former USS Doyen
 USTS Bay State III (1974–1978) former Empire State IV, former USS Henry Gibbins
 USTS Empire State V (1979) former USNS Barrett, borrowed from SUNY Maritime
 USTS Bay State IV (1980–1981) former Barrett class USNS Geiger, destroyed by fire, December 1981
 USTS State of Maine (1982–1983) former Barrett class USNS Upshur, borrowed from Maine Maritime Academy
 USTS Empire State V (1984) borrowed again from SUNY Maritime
 USTS State of Maine (1985) borrowed again from Maine Maritime Academy
 USTS Patriot State (1986–1998) former Santa Mercedes
 USTS Empire State VI (1999–2003) borrowed from SUNY Maritime
 USTS Enterprise (2003–2008) former USNS Cape Bon, former SS Velma Lykes
 USTS Kennedy (2009–Present) rechristened from Enterprise in honor of the Kennedy family

Shanghai exchange program 
The academy offers an exchange program to Shanghai Maritime University, an 18,000-student school situated next to a deep-water port. Cadets spend 100 days in the Shanghai program taking maritime business, law, and marketing classes and exploring the country to gain the experience they will need in the international maritime field. Four months later, Chinese cadets make the trek to Taylor's Point and spend a semester at Massachusetts Maritime Academy. They are immersed into American culture, featuring trips to Boston, New York, Washington DC, and Plymouth Plantation.

Campus alternative and renewable energy
Massachusetts Maritime Academy has done a great deal of work to incorporate green and safe energy to the campus. The campus green energy initiative consists of solar panels on top of the dormitories that provide 81 kilowatts of solar power to the campus. The Academy also owns a 660 kilowatt wind turbine that provides nearly 20 percent of the campus's  electricity.

Combined heat and power has been installed in the dormitories.  Micro-turbines (small scale combustion turbines) generate electricity for the campus while utilizing the waste heat and flue exhaust to heat the hot water used in the dormitories.

The American Bureau of Shipping (ABS) Information Commons is a LEED (Leadership in Energy and Environmental Design) Platinum Building. The 42,000 square foot building opened in September 2011 and was a 23 million dollar project. The construction of the building used 100% recycled steel; 20% recycled concrete; and 40% recycled insulation. The wood in the building is
all bamboo as well. The building is cooled and heated by a geothermal system along with chilled beam technology. Additional light sensors and natural light are provided with skylights reducing the need for artificial lighting when enough natural light is present. The building is furnished with water conserving fixtures and the landscaping uses no irrigation for the planted areas. Water captured from the roof irrigates plantings adjacent to the building. In addition, the pitch of the roof of the ABS Information Commons increases the airflow  directed towards the wind turbine by 8%.

Athletics

The Massachusetts Maritime Academy fields 15 varsity athletic teams (7 men's, 7 women's ,1 co-ed) competing in the Massachusetts State Collegiate Athletic Conference at the NCAA Division III level.

Notable alumni
 William J. Flanagan, Jr., Admiral, USN (retired), MMA class of 1964; served as Commander in Chief, U.S. Atlantic Fleet (CINCLANTFLT) 1994-1996
 Christine M. Griffin, past deputy director of the United States Office of Personnel Management.
 Captain Richard Phillips, Maersk Alabama captain during Somali piracy attack
 Lee Van Gemert, Class of 1940. Author of "Stability and Trim for the Ship's Officer", the Merchant Marine standard textbook on the subject.  He is also one of the co-founders of the Sierra Bravo Delta Club, which some believe to be the school's first and only fraternity (no longer in existence).
 Captain Emery Rice, Commander, USNR, MMA, Class of 1891. Quartermaster of USS Olympia at the Battle of Manila Bay; while in command of a freighter in World War I, attacked, rammed and sank a German U-boat, for which he received the Navy Cross

References

External links
 Official website
 Official athletics website
 Pictures and history of training ships (including borrowed ships)

 

 
Liberal arts colleges in Massachusetts
Maritime colleges in the United States
Educational institutions established in 1891
Military academies of the United States
Universities and colleges in Barnstable County, Massachusetts
1891 establishments in Massachusetts
Public universities and colleges in Massachusetts